Sisters’ Rocks are islands in the Republic of Trinidad and Tobago in thee Caribbean Sea.  It is located off the northern coast of Tobago directly north of Parlatuvier. Sisters' Rock is popular for snorkeling and scuba diving. The coral reef to the landward eastern side hosts black durgons, brown chromis, creole wrasse, and dwarf angelfish.

See also
 Islands of Trinidad and Tobago
 List of Caribbean islands

References

Uninhabited islands of Trinidad and Tobago
Geography of Tobago